Igor Kotko (born 3 January 1963) is a Soviet rower. He won a gold medal at the 1986 World Rowing Championships in Nottingham with the men's quadruple sculls.

References

1963 births
Living people
Soviet male rowers
World Rowing Championships medalists for the Soviet Union